Edward Bootle-Wilbraham, 1st Baron Skelmersdale (7 March 1771 – 3 April 1853), was a British landowner and politician.

Life
Bootle-Wilbraham was the son of Richard Wilbraham-Bootle and his wife Mary, daughter of Robert Bootle. He inherited Lathom House on the death of his father in 1796 and changed his name by royal licence in 1814 to Bootle-Wilbraham .

He was elected to the House of Commons for Westbury in 1795, a seat he held until 1796, and then represented Newcastle-under-Lyme from 1796 to 1812, Clitheroe from 1812 to 1818 and Dover from 1818 to 1828. On 30 January 1828 he was raised to the peerage as Baron Skelmersdale, of Skelmersdale in the County Palatine of Lancaster.

Lord Skelmersdale married Mary Elizabeth, daughter of Reverend Edward Taylor, in 1796. She died in 1840. Skelmersdale survived her by thirteen years and died in April 1853, aged 82.
They had a number of children, including: Richard Bootle-Wilbraham (1801–1844), Edward Bootle-Wilbraham (1807–1882), and Emma Caroline Smith-Stanley, Countess of Derby.

He was succeeded in the barony by his grandson Edward, his eldest son the Hon. Richard Bootle-Wilbraham having predeceased him.

Notes

References
Kidd, Charles, Williamson, David (editors). Debrett's Peerage and Baronetage (1990 edition). New York: St Martin's Press, 1990,

External links
Portrait of Lord Skelmersdale
 

1771 births
Skelmersdale, Edward Bootle-Wilbraham, 1st Baron
People from Lathom
Skelmersdale, Edward Bootle-Wilbraham, 1st Baron
Skelmersdale
Members of the Parliament of the United Kingdom for Newcastle-under-Lyme
British MPs 1790–1796
British MPs 1796–1800
Members of the Parliament of the United Kingdom for Dover
UK MPs 1801–1802
UK MPs 1802–1806
UK MPs 1806–1807
UK MPs 1812–1818
UK MPs 1818–1820
UK MPs 1820–1826
UK MPs 1826–1830
UK MPs who were granted peerages